"Francine" is a song recorded by the American rock band ZZ Top from their album Rio Grande Mud, released in 1971. "Francine" gave ZZ Top their first bona fide hit reaching #69 on the Billboard charts. It is the only single released from the Rio Grande Mud album. Various official ZZ Top releases throughout the years, beginning in 1972, have used the alternative spelling "Francene", especially on the various single releases, both within and outside the United States. The song was actually written by Billy Gibbons with Steve Perron and Kenny Cordray.

Personnel
Frank Beard – drums
Billy Gibbons – guitar, lead vocals
Dusty Hill – bass guitar, backing vocals

References

1971 songs
1971 singles
London Records singles
ZZ Top songs
Song recordings produced by Bill Ham